Dmitry Lyzik (born 31 January  2000) is a Russian volleyball player, a member of the club Lokomotiv Novosibirsk.

Sporting achievements

Clubs 
Russia Championship:
  2020
  2021

References

External links
LokoVolley profile
Volley Service profile
Volley profile
Volleybox profile
CEV profile
CEV profile

2000 births
Living people
Russian men's volleyball players